Robert Kearsley (1822 – 22 October 1892) was a British Liberal Party  politician.

Vyner was elected MP for Ripon at the 1865 general election and held the seat until 1868 when the seat was reduced to one member and he stood down.

References

External links
 

Liberal Party (UK) MPs for English constituencies
UK MPs 1865–1868
1822 births
1892 deaths